Santiago del Estero Quichua or Santiagueño Quechua (Santiagen Quichua) is a vulnerable dialect of Southern Quechua spoken by 60,000-100,000 people (estimates vary widely) in Argentina. It is spoken in the province of Santiago del Estero. The estimated coordinates are 27°47′S 64°16′W.  Long-standing migration has also resulted in the presence of the language in other provinces of northeastern Argentina and in Buenos Aires. 

It is 81% similar to other Quechuan languages. There are radio programs in this languages and also a dictionary. There is some cultivation of the language as it is taught in some schools. It uses the Roman alphabet. Its speakers are Native Americans and they mostly work in agriculture. It is the seventh-most widely spoken language in Argentina behind Spanish, Italian, Levantine Arabic, South Bolivian Quechua, Standard German, and Mapudungun. It is the third most widely spoken indigenous language.

There was once another dialect of Southern Quechua in Argentina, that of Catamarca and La Rioja, but it has gone extinct. All were introduced during the Spanish colonial period, as Quechua speakers were transplanted to various parts of the Spanish realm (continuing a practice of the Inca), and Quechua was an official language of Santiago, Catamarca, and La Rioja during the colonial era.

Classification
Quechuan, Peripheral Quechua, Chinchay

People
The indigenous people of Santiago del Estero were referred to as the "tonocoté". They faced much racism and discrimination from the rest of the Argentinian population which led to the diminishing of their language and culture as a whole. The government even went so far as to release flyers describing what these indigenous people looked like, including red skin and the use of feathers in their clothing. For this reason, they were singled out among the rest of the Hispanic population. Instead of learning their maternal language of Santiagueño Quechua at school, indigenous children were looked over and forced to learn the official Spanish language, which is a contributing factor as to why this language became endangered.

Syntax
The verb of movement "to go" has been extensively studied and compared to other dialects of Quechua. It was found that while in other dialects, this verb is used to represent physical movement, in Santiagueño Quechua, it represents a future action. This can be compared to the modern Spanish phrase "ir a" which means "to go" + infinitive in Santiagueño Quechua.

Pasado no experimentado
It has been discovered that a new category of verb exists in this Quechua language: Pasado no experimentado, which adds a certain suffix to words to represent information that has been related to someone from another person. Usually, the suffix that corresponds to this is -ra. Ex: "niara".

Phonology
There are five vowel phonemes primarily used in this language: .

Examples
Many of the following examples have strong similarity to, or borrow words from the Spanish language.
cóndor- vulture
 cocaví-> provisions for a trip
qólpa; choclo-> an ear of corn
kúnliir; molle-> tree of life
múli or porongo-> pumpkin
'kúntur; chingana-> a sort of brothel
tarúka-> deer
wik*úña; vincha-> hair tie
qaparis ti(y)anku-> "they are yelling" 
na riq rini ñuqá-> "I am already going to go"
más vale rini kutiq-> "Maybe I'll go back"
nuqa cuchilluyta manasuq-> "I'll lend you my knife"
Brachup historian rini cuentasuq-> "I will tell you the story of El Bracho."

Notes

References
History and Geography of Santiago Quichua (in Spanish)
http://www.crimic.paris-sorbonne.fr/actes/dc/courthes.pdf
http://halshs.ccsd.cnrs.fr/halshs-00005497
http://roabastos.monsite.orange.fr
Coronel-Molina, S. M., & McDowell, J. H. (2011). Proceedings of the First Symposium on Teaching Indigenous Languages of Latin America. Retrieved from http://kellogg.nd.edu/projects/quechua/STLILLA/STILLA 2008 Proceedings-MLCP-CLACS-ATLILLA2.pdf#page=287

Gutiérrez, G. D. (1997). Un fenómeno de convergencia lingüística por contacto en el quechua de Santiago del Estero: El desarrollo del futuro verbal perifrástico. Estudios Filológicos Estud. Filol., (32). Retrieved from http://red.pucp.edu.pe/ridei/wp-content/uploads/biblioteca/110503.doc.pdf
Lorenzino, G. A. (2003). Bilingüismo y Migración Urbana: El Quechua Santiagueño. Selected Proceedings of the First Workshop on Spanish Sociolinguistics, 53-60. Retrieved from http://www.lingref.com/cpp/wss/1/paper1007.pdf
Parodi, C. (1973). Observaciones en torno a los quechuismos del Diccionario Etimológico de Corominas. 11. Retrieved from http://www.revistas.unam.mx/index.php/ral/article/view/38764/35248
De Granda, G. (1998). De nuevo sobre Quechua y Español en el noroeste argentino. Reexamen de algunos temas. Retrieved fromhttp://ezproxybib.pucp.edu.pe/index.php/lexis/article/viewFile/7320/7533
De Granda, G. (1997). Una modalidad de transferencia lingüística por contacto. Procesos de reanálisis en el quechua de Santiago del Estero (Argentina). Retrieved from http://www.nuevosfoliosbioetica.uchile.cl/index.php/BDF/article/viewFile/21481/22779
De Granda, G. (1997). DOS RASGOS DEL SISTEMA CASUAL DEL QUECHUA SANTIAGUEÑO Y SUS POSIBLES FACTORES CONDICIONANTES. Retrieved from http://revistas.pucp.edu.pe/index.php/lexis/article/view/7390/7612
De Granda, G. (2000). Evolución y condicionamientos de un parámetro gramatical en la lengua quechua. La marcación morfológica de la categoría número. Evolución Y Condicionamientos De Un Parámetro. Retrieved from http://revistas.pucp.edu.pe/index.php/lexis/article/viewFile/4936/4934

External links
Ethnologue: Santiago del Estero Quichua
Course on Quechua
Quechuan Culture
Endangered Languages Page
Sorosoro Page
Atlas of Indigenous places in Latin America
Refworld Page
Glottolog Page

Languages of Argentina
Quechuan languages